The Moog Center for Deaf Education is an American school in St. Louis, Missouri, founded in 1996 by oralist educator Jean Sachar Moog.

The Moog Center is an independent, not-for-profit school that provides education services to children – birth to early elementary years – with hearing loss and their families.

There are eight certified Moog programs that offer oral education for deaf and hard-of-hearing children and their families:

 Buffalo Hearing and Speech Center in Buffalo, New York
 Child's Voice in the Chicago, Illinois, area
 Colegio Las Lomas Oral in Buenos Aires, Argentina
 Desert Voices in Phoenix, Arizona 
 The Moog Center for Deaf Education in St. Louis, Missouri
 Northern Voices in the Twin Cities, Minnesota
 Ohio Valley Voices in Cincinnati, Ohio
 Presbyterian Ear Institute Oral School in Albuquerque, New Mexico

The focus of the curriculum is accelerating development of spoken language and, when the children are ready, to help them learn the same subjects as their hearing age-mates so they can catch up and be full participants in the mainstream.

References

External links
Moog Center for Deaf Education

Schools for the deaf in the United States
Schools in St. Louis